Thomas Scott may refer to:

Australia 
 Thomas Hobbes Scott (1783–1860), Anglican clergyman and first Archdeacon of New South Wales
 Thomas Scott (Australian politician) (1865–1946), member of the Queensland Legislative Assembly
 Thomas Scott (Tasmania) (fl. 1824), Assistant Surveyor-General of Tasmania

Canada 
 Thomas Scott (Canadian judge) (1746–1824), judge and political figure in Upper Canada
 Thomas Scott (Manitoba politician) (1841–1915), member of the Canadian House of Commons from Manitoba
 Thomas Scott (Ontario politician) (c. 1828–1883), represented Grey North in the Legislative Assembly of Ontario, 1867–1879
 Thomas Scott (Orangeman) (c. 1842–1870), executed during the Red River Rebellion by Louis Riel
 Thomas Seaton Scott (1826–1895), Canadian architect
 Walter Scott (Canadian politician) (Thomas Walter Scott, 1867–1938), first premier of Saskatchewan, member of the Canadian House of Commons

New Zealand 
 Thomas Scott (1816–1892), New Zealand police officer and hotel-keeper

United Kingdom 
Thomas Rotherham (1423–1500), Archbishop of York, born Thomas Scot or Scott
 Sir Thomas Scott (died 1594) (1535–1594), English Member of Parliament and High Sheriff of Kent
 Thomas Scott (died 1610) (c. 1563–1610), MP for Aylesbury
 Thomas Scott (preacher) (c. 1580–1626), English preacher and radical Protestant
 Thomas Scott (died 1635), MP for Canterbury
 Thomas Scot (died 1660), English Member of Parliament and one of the regicides of King Charles I
 Thomas Scott (hymnwriter) (1705–1775), English dissenting minister and hymn writer
 Thomas Scott (commentator) (1747–1821), Anglican clergyman and commentator on the Bible
 Thomas Scott (cricketer) (1766–1799), English cricketer
 Thomas Scott, 2nd Earl of Clonmell (1783–1838), Irish politician
 Thomas Scott (zoologist) (1840–1929), an ostracodologist
 Thomas Scott (Bishop of North China) (1879–1956), Anglican bishop in China
 Thomas Scott (artist), father of the painter Alexander Scott and portraitist for The Illustrated London News
 Thomas Henry Scott (1889–1901), English executioner
 Thomas Scott (footballer) (1895–1976), Scottish footballer (Falkirk FC) 
 Thomas Scott (British Army officer) (1905–1976), British Army general and Lord Lieutenant of Fermanagh
 Thomas Scott (diver) (1907–?), British diver
 Tommy Scott (English musician) (born 1964), lead singer of UK band Space
 Tom Scott (presenter), British YouTuber
 Thomas Scott (footballer, born 2003), English footballer (Sunderland A.F.C.)

United States 
 Thomas Scott (American politician) (1739–1796), American politician in Pennsylvania
 Thomas Scott (Ohio judge) (1772–1856), Clerk of the Ohio State Senate and Ohio Supreme Court Judge
 Thomas Scott (archer) (1833–1911), American archer who competed at the 1904 Summer Olympics
 Thomas Scott (karateka) (born 1990), American karateka
 Thomas Fielding Scott (1807–1867), Episcopal bishop in America
 Thomas A. Scott (1823–1881), American businessman, railway executive, and early "robber baron" industrialist
 Thomas B. Scott (1829–1886), Wisconsin politician
 Thomas M. Scott (1829–1876), American Confederate general
 Thomas Scott (Florida judge) (born 1948), American lawyer and federal judge
 Thomas H. Scott (1865–?), architect in Pittsburgh

See also 

 Tommy Scott (disambiguation)
 Tom Scott (disambiguation)
 Scott Thomas (disambiguation)